Edward Joseph "E. J." Feihl (born  March 27, 1970) is a Filipino retired professional basketball player of German Filipino descent.

He stands 7'1" tall, making him the tallest Filipino professional basketball player ever to play in the PBA. At the UAAP, Feihl debuted for the UST Growling Tigers in 1990 but decided to play for the Adamson Soaring Falcons the following season. In 1992, he helped the collegiate team reach the final but conceded the title to FEU. He represented the Philippines in several international competitions.

Feihl was drafted by Ginebra San Miguel in 1995 and played for two seasons with the team. A controversial talk about a contract extension led to Feihl's departure in 1997. He then played briefly for the AMA Cybertigers in the Philippine Basketball League.

In the 1997 PBA Governor's Cup, Feihl was traded by Ginebra, then already named the Gordon's Gin Boars, to the Purefoods Carne Norte Cowboys in exchange for Cris Bolado. Feihl played for the team from 1997 to 2001 before he was traded back to the Boars.

In 1998, Feihl was a member of the Philippine Centennial Team that took home a bronze medal in the Bangkok Asian Games. In 2002, he was part of the RP National Pool for the 2002 Asian Games, though he didn't make the final cut.

Feihl did not play a single game in his second stint with Barangay Ginebra as he was sent to the Alaska Aces in exchange for James Wallkvist in 2002. Feihl would go on to play for the Aces until 2004.

In 2005–06 season he joined the Red Bull Barako spending most of his time on the reserve list. In the middle of the eliminations of the All Filipino Conference of the 2006–07 season, he was signed by the Welcoat Dragons.

In 2007, Feihl announced his retirement from professional basketball.

In 2017 it was reported that Feihl will play with the General Santos Kings of the Mindanao Basketball League, a regional minor league.

In 2018, Feihl served as the Pit Stop greeter during the 10th leg of The Amazing Race 32 in Manila, Philippines at Rizal Park.

References

1970 births
Living people
Alaska Aces (PBA) players
Asian Games bronze medalists for the Philippines
Asian Games medalists in basketball
Barako Bull Energy Boosters players
Barangay Ginebra San Miguel players
Basketball players at the 1998 Asian Games
Basketball players from Pangasinan
Centers (basketball)
Filipino people of German descent
Magnolia Hotshots players
Philippine Basketball Association All-Stars
Philippines men's national basketball team players
Filipino men's basketball players
Rain or Shine Elasto Painters players
Adamson Soaring Falcons basketball players
Medalists at the 1998 Asian Games
UST Growling Tigers basketball players
Barangay Ginebra San Miguel draft picks